Mao Zedong  is a 2013 Chinese epic biographical television series which dramatises the life of Mao Zedong, former Chairman of the Chinese Communist Party and the main founder of the People's Republic of China. It was directed by Gao Xixi, and starred Tang Guoqiang, Liu Jing, Li Bowen, Guo Lianwen, and Wang Wufu. The television series was released in 2013 to mark the 120th anniversary of the birth of Mao Zedong.

Cast

Mao and other Communist Party leaders
 Hou Jingjian as Younger Mao Zedong.
 Tang Guoqiang as Mao Zedong.
 Liu Congdan as Yang Kaihui, Mao's first wife.
 Liu Jing as Zhou Enlai.
 Xia Dejun as Younger Zhou Enlai.
 Wang Wufu as Zhu De.
 Ren Shan as Younger Zhu De.
 Guo Lianwen as Liu Shaoqi.
 Zong Liqun as Peng Dehuai.
 Sun Hongtao as Zhang Wentian.
 Wang Yanan as Ye Ting.
 Wang Biqi as He Zizhen, Mao's second wife.
 Shao Feng as Wang Jiaxiang.
 Fan Ying as Mao Anying, Mao's elder son.
 Sun Jia as Madame Mao, Mao's third wife.
 You Liping as Lin Biao.
 Wang Jian as Ren Bishi.
 Zhao Liqiang as Xi Zhongxun.
 Xu Maomao as Nie Rongzhen.
 Gu Wei as Chen Yi.
 Xie Gang as Chen Yun.

Kuomintang leaders
 Ma Xiaowei as Chiang Kai-shek.
 Zhao Kai as Chiang Ching-kuo.
 Yu Bin as Zhang Xueliang.
 Liu Bo as H. H. Kung.
 Ke Lan as Soong Ai-ling.
 Zhang Junhan as Chen Lifu.
 Yu Mingjia as Madame Chiang Kai-shek.
 Tse Kwan-ho as Sun Yat-sen.
 Liu Yijun  as Wang Jingwei.

Others
 Zhang Chaowen as Xiao Zisheng.
 Wang Renjun as Guangxu Emperor.
 Zhao Hanjun as Huang Yanpei.
 Miura Kenichi as Hideki Tojo.
 Li Bowen
 Wang Gongliang

Production 
Shooting began in December 2012 and took place in various locations including Hunan, Shaanxi, Chongqing, Beijing, and Shanghai.

Award

References

External links
   Mao Zedong 163.COM 
  Mao Zedong CNTV 

2013 Chinese television series debuts
2014 Chinese television series endings
Television series set in the Qing dynasty
Cultural depictions of Mao Zedong
Cultural depictions of Zhou Enlai
Cultural depictions of Zhu De
Cultural depictions of Liu Shaoqi
Cultural depictions of Deng Xiaoping
Cultural depictions of Peng Dehuai
Cultural depictions of Sun Yat-sen
Cultural depictions of Chiang Kai-shek
Cultural depictions of Hideki Tojo
Chinese documentary television series
Chinese period television series
Television shows set in Guizhou
Television shows set in Hunan
Television shows set in Beijing
Television shows set in Jiangxi
Television shows set in Shaanxi
Television shows set in Fujian
Television shows set in Chongqing